Kyle Dean Massey (born November 17, 1981) is an American actor and singer. He is best known for his leading roles in the Broadway musicals Wicked – for which he has played Fiyero on-and-off from 2007 to 2019 – Next to Normal, and Pippin. He played the recurring role of openly gay country music songwriter Kevin Bicks on the ABC/CMT musical drama series Nashville (2015–2018).

Career
Massey first joined the North American touring production of Wicked in 2007, as part of the ensemble and understudy for the lead role of Fiyero, before joining the Broadway production. He subsequently played Thalia in Broadway's Xanadu from April 2008 until its closing that September, and Matthew in Altar Boyz Off-Broadway from October 2006 to June 2007.

From June to September 2009, he temporarily played the role of Gabe in the Broadway musical Next to Normal, after which he remained as a cover for the role, before assuming the role permanently in January 2010. Massey stayed with the show until it closed in January 2011, when he then returned to Broadway's Wicked, this time in the lead role of Fiyero. He left in March of that year to star in Lucky Guy, which opened Off-Broadway in April 2011.

Following the closure of Lucky Guy, he returned to Wicked as Fiyero, covering for Richard H. Blake, who took a three-week absence to be with his newborn child. He later returned to the touring production of Wicked, playing Fiyero from November 2011 through February 2012. On July 31, 2012, he once again joined Broadway's Wicked as Fiyero until May 26, 2013. He played the role again in the Broadway production from December 2013 to February 2014. He appeared in 2012 Broadway Bares with Miriam Shor. In August 2013, he played Tony in The Muny production of West Side Story.

On April 1, Massey assumed the title role in the Broadway revival of Pippin. He finished his run on October 29.

On January 23, 2015, it was reported that Massey was cast in a recurring role as openly gay country music songwriter Kevin Bicks in the ABC television musical drama series Nashville.

Personal life
Massey grew up in Jonesboro, Arkansas where his father is a Certified Public Accountant and his mother is a teacher. He attended Blessed Sacrament Catholic School for elementary school. Massey received a BFA in Musical Theatre from Southwest Missouri State University (now Missouri State University) in 2004.

He is gay. He married fellow actor Taylor Frey on October 1, 2016. He supports the It Gets Better Project. On April 22, 2021, he and Frey announced that they were  expecting their first child via surrogacy. The couple welcomed their daughter, Rafa Massey-Frey, via surrogate on October 31, 2021.

Filmography

Film

Television

Theater

Web

References

External links
 
 
 
 

1981 births
American male film actors
American male musical theatre actors
American male television actors
American gay actors
Place of birth missing (living people)
American gay musicians
LGBT people from Arkansas
Living people
Missouri State University alumni
20th-century American LGBT people
21st-century American LGBT people